Digel Block was a historic commercial building located at Hannibal, Marion County, Missouri.  It was built in 1901, and was a two-story red-brick building. It featured an ornamental parapet screening a flat roof. It has been demolished.

It was added to the National Register of Historic Places in 1986.

References

Commercial buildings on the National Register of Historic Places in Missouri
Commercial buildings completed in 1901
Buildings and structures in Hannibal, Missouri
National Register of Historic Places in Marion County, Missouri